The High School is a 12–18 mixed, Church of Ireland, independent secondary school in Rathgar, Dublin, Ireland.

It was established in 1870 at Harcourt Street before moving to Rathgar in 1971 and amalgamated with The Diocesan School for Girls in 1974, becoming co-educational.

In 2009, it was ranked as the best-performing school in Ireland in terms of progression to third-level education. 

It is part of the Erasmus Smith Trust.

Notable alumni 

 Lenny Abrahamson, film director and screenwriter
 Ernest Alton, university professor, independent Teachta Dála and Senator
Ryan Baird, rugby union player
 Nicola Daly, hockey player
 Charles D'Arcy, bishop
 John Duggan, bishop
 Jonathan Garth, cricketer
 C. G. Grey, editor and writer
 Howard Kilroy, accountant and businessman
 F. S. L. Lyons, historian and academic
 William Kirkpatrick Magee, author, editor, and librarian
 Brian McCracken, judge
 Roly Meates, former Ireland national rugby union team coach
 Alison Meeke, hockey player
 Greg Molins, cricketer
 Jason Molins, cricketer
 J. Alec Motyer, biblical scholar
 Annalise Murphy, sailor
 William Noblett, priest and author
 David Norris, scholar, independent Senator and civil rights activist
 Denis O'Brien, businessman
 Shane O'Donoghue, field hockey player
 Caoimhín Ó Raghallaigh, fiddler
 Philip Orr BIL, rugby union player
 John Robbie BIL, rugby union player
 Trevor Sargent, politician and priest
 Alan Shatter, politician
 Roland Shortt, cricketer
 John Thorpe, priest
 William Thrift, university professor and independent Teachta Dála
 Jack Butler Yeats, artist and Olympic medallist
 William Butler Yeats, poet and dramatist

See also
 Pearse Street, Dublin

References

External links 
 

Rathgar
Secondary schools in Dublin (city)
Private schools in the Republic of Ireland
Anglican schools in the Republic of Ireland
1870 establishments in Ireland
Educational institutions established in 1870